This was the fifth season of Barnes Football Club.

Athletic Sports
 Date: 30 March 1867
 Venue: Field belonging to J. Johnstone, Barnes.
 Committee: Ebenezer Morley (starter), R. W. Willis, A. D. Houseman (judges).
 Events: 100 yards flat race, 1000 yards handicap flat race, one mile flat race, "football race", 220 yards hurdle race, one mile steeplechase, high jump, high jump with pole

Notes

Barnes F.C. seasons
Barnes